Archigraptis limacina is a species of moth of the family Tortricidae. It is found in Burma and Thailand.

References

Moths described in 1964
Tortricini
Moths of Asia